The 2012 São Tomé and Principe Championship was the 27th season of the São Tomé and Principe Championship the top-level football championship of São Tomé and Principe. It began on 1 May and concluded on 5 November.  Sporting Clube do Principe from São Tomé island won their second title.

Teams
15 teams participated in the São Tomé and Principe Championship, 10 from São Tomé Island and 5 from Príncipe Island. At the end of season champion of São Tomé Island League and champion of Principe Island League play one match for champion of São Tomé and Principe.

São Tomé teams 2012

First Division

Second Division
The Second Division featured two zones (sometimes as groups), A & B.  The first place of each zone heads to the Second Division championships and the winner was crowned Second Division Champions, all of its finals participants qualified into the Premier Division in the following season including Futebol Club Aliança Nacional (Zone A) and Agrosport (Zone B).

Zone A
 Inter Bom-Bom 
 Os Dinâmicos/Porto - Folha Fede
 Juba Diogo Simão 
 Palmar 
 Porto Alegre 
 FC Ribeira Peixe
 Santa Margarida 
 Santana FC
 Trindade FC 
 Varzim FC - Ribeira Afonso

Zone B
 Amador - Agostinho Neto
 Andorinha Sport Club 
 Desportivo Conde 
 Correia 
 CD Guadalupe
 Kê Morabeza  - in the following season, the club would change its name to Kë Morabeza
 Desportivo Marítimo - Micoló
 FC Neves
 Sporting São Tomé
 Diogo Vaz

Third Division
It was the first season that featured the Third Division.

Principe teams 2012

Five clubs took part, FC Porto Real did not participated during the season which reduced the number of matches to eight. The competition started in May and finished in October. Sporting won the 2012 title and participated in the national championship match in November. Sporting defeated UDAPB 1–0 in the final match of the season.

National final

The national final match took place on November 5, 2012 at noon. The match featured Sporting from Príncipe and Sporting Praia Cruz, it was the "Sporting" challenge. Every goal were scored in the last few minutes of the match. The first were scored by Remi Lima at the 86th minute, the second was a penalty kick which was scored by Sporting Praia's Jair which tied up the game, at additional time, Remy Lima scored the last two goals and Sporting Príncipe went on to win their second in a row and most recent national title and qualified into the 2013 CAF Champions League.

References

Football competitions in São Tomé and Príncipe
Sao
Championship